The Amaraugha Prabodha (Sanskrit: अमरौघप्रबोध) is a 12th century Sanskrit text on hatha yoga, attributed to Gorakshanath. Its close connection with a Vajrayana text, the Amritasiddhi, implies a Buddhist origin for the practice of hatha yoga.

Yoga text

The Amaraugha Prabodha is a 12th century Shaivite Sanskrit text on hatha yoga, attributed to Gorakshanath. It is closely related to the 11th century Amritasiddhi, a Vajrayana Buddhist work, describing the same physical yoga practices, but adding Shaivite philosophy, subsuming hatha yoga under raja yoga, and reducing the use of Vajrayana terms. The Amaraugha Prabodha is the earliest text that combines hatha yoga with raja yoga. It was likely used by Svatmarama when he wrote the 15th century Hatha yoga pradipika.

The text defines hatha yoga as the type of yoga, as distinct from mantra yoga, laya yoga, and raja yoga, which manipulates the breath and the bindu (semen).

References

Sources 

 
 

12th-century books
Sanskrit books
Hatha yoga texts